Manchester North End F.C. was an association football club based in Blackley, Manchester, England. The club was founded in 1922 as New Cross F.C. and joined the Lancashire Combination, before changing its name the following year. In the 1924–25 season, Manchester North End left the Lancashire Combination and entered the Cheshire County League, where they remained until 1939, when the club folded. 

During the club's existence, Manchester North End participated in the FA Cup, England's foremost cup competition, on several occasions, reaching the fourth qualifying round twice.

FA Cup results

See also
Jack Lawton

References
Manchester North End history at the Football Club History Database
The FA Cup results archive at TheFA.com 

Defunct football clubs in England
Association football clubs established in 1922
Association football clubs disestablished in 1939
Football clubs in Manchester
Lancashire Combination
1922 establishments in England
1939 disestablishments in England
Defunct football clubs in Greater Manchester
History of sport in Manchester
Cheshire County League clubs
Defunct football clubs in Lancashire